The Delaware Contemporary is Delaware's only contemporary art museum. Founded in 1979 as the Delaware Center for Contemporary Arts (DCCA) it rebranded to its current name in 2015. It is a non-collecting museum focused on work by local, regional, as well as national and international artists.

The Delaware Contemporary moved to the Riverfront in Wilmington, Delaware in 2000.  The 33,000-square-foot building includes seven galleries, 26 art studios, an auditorium, a classroom, a museum shop, and administrative offices.
In 2008, it ceased charging admission to view the galleries to offer families more affordable cultural choices during the recession.

See also
 Delaware Art Museum
 List of museums in Delaware
 University Museums at the University of Delaware

References

External links
 Delaware Contemporary
 Brandywine 10
 Wilmington Riverfront

1979 establishments in Delaware
Art museums established in 1979
Art museums and galleries in Delaware
Brandywine Museums & Gardens Alliance
Contemporary art galleries in the United States
Museums in Wilmington, Delaware
Wilmington Riverfront